Silver Creek Communications Annex was a 373.7 metres ( 1226 ft ) tall guyed mast used by the USAF Survivable Low Frequency Communications System Site, which was built near Silver Creek, Nebraska at 
.  Detachment 1, 33d Communications Squadron, 1st Aerospace Communications Group (later 55th Communications Group) out of Offutt AFB, ran the site until its inactivation.

History
The SAC SLFCS site at Silver Creek was built as a project assigned to the 32d Communications Squadron. The site was accepted by Headquarters USAF on 29 July 1968, and was activated for continuous operations on 19 August 1968. on 5 September 1968, operational testing began at Silver Creek.

Facility

Silver Creek's radio tower was a mast radiator insulated against ground, which provided VLF communication to ground and mobile nuclear missile facilities during the Cold War. It transmitted at a maximum power of 110 kW. The facility was partially built into the ground and was designed to withstand a moderate nuclear blast from a distance of 10 miles. The facility was self-sustaining and employed a sophisticated ventilation system as well as backup diesel generators.

See also
Strategic Air Command
Post Attack Command and Control System
Survivable Low Frequency Communications System
Hawes Radio Tower - sister facility in California

References

Towers in Nebraska
United States nuclear command and control
Radio masts and towers in the United States
1968 establishments in Nebraska
1995 disestablishments in Nebraska
Buildings and structures in Merrick County, Nebraska
Towers completed in 1968